The J. N. Petit Library (officially the J. N. Petit Institute) is a membership library in a Grade II heritage structure in Fort, Mumbai. It was founded in 1898 by a group of Parsi students studying at Elphinstone College. Membership is open to residents of Mumbai.

The library is one of the finest examples of Neo-Gothic architecture in Mumbai. In 2014–15, it was restored by a team led by the conservation architect Vikas Dilawari. The restoration project won the Award of Distinction under the UNESCO Asia-Pacific Awards for Cultural Heritage Conservation in 2015.

History
The library traces its origins to a smaller library that was set up in 1856 by students of Elphinstone College who were living in Fort. In the beginning, it was called the "Fort Improvement Library". In 1895, the Parsi philanthropist Bai Dinbai Nusserwanji Petit donated 250,000 for the construction of a library building, to be erected in memory of her deceased son, Jamsetjee Nesserwanjee Petit or J. N. Petit. The library was inaugurated on 1 May 1898. Today, it is run by a private trust, which depends on donations and membership fees.

Architecture

The library is considered to be among the finest examples of Gothic Revival architecture in the city. It was designed in the Venetian Gothic variant with a polychromatic limestone exterior. It has two storeys and a mezzanine, and the high-ceilinged reading room has stained glass portraits of the Petit family.

Restoration

Between 2014 and 2015, the library was restored by the conservation architect Vikas Dilawari and his team. Both exteriors and interiors, including the Reading Room, were restored to the original state. The stained glass was restored by Swati Chandgadkar, one of the country's few glass restorers. In 2015, the restoration project won the Award of Distinction under the UNESCO Asia-Pacific Awards for Cultural Heritage Conservation.

Collection

The library has about 150,000 books and a strong collection on Zoroastrianism that includes old manuscripts. The collection comprises mostly English language-books, but there are some in other languages, including Marathi, Hindi, Gujarati, Sanskrit, Urdu and Persian.  It has a rare copy of the 11th-century epic poem Shahname by Ferdowsi, which is illustrated with gold leaf.

Membership
There is a tiered system for membership, which is open to all residents of the city. The current member strength is about 2,000.

References

External links

Library buildings completed in 1898
Tourist attractions in Mumbai
Libraries in Mumbai
UNESCO Asia-Pacific Heritage Awards winners
Libraries established in 1898